S-adenosyl-L-methionine:flavonoid 4'-O-methyltransferase may refer to:
 Kaempferol 4'-O-methyltransferase
 Flavonoid 4'-O-methyltransferase